Gent may refer to:

 Alan Neville Gent (1927–2012), English physicist
 Billy Gent (1879–1957), Australian rules footballer
 Chris Gent (born 1948), British businessman
 Don Gent (1933–1996), Australian rules footballer
 Edward Gent (1895–1948), British colony administrator
 Georgie Gent (born 1988), English tennis player
 Ian Gent, British computer scientist
 John Thomas Gent, British clock maker
 Keith Gent (born 1945), Australian rules footballer
 Mike Gent (born 1971), American musician
 Peter Gent (1942–2011), American writer and football player
 Robert Gent-Davis (1857–1903), English businessman and politician
 Thomas Gent (1693–1778), printer and author

See also
 Van Gent (disambiguation)